The 18th World Science Fiction Convention (Worldcon), also known as Pittcon, was held on 3–5 September 1960 at the Penn-Sheraton Hotel in Pittsburgh, Pennsylvania, United States.

The convention was chaired by Dirce Archer.

Participants 

Attendance was 568.

Guests of Honor 

 James Blish
 Isaac Asimov (toastmaster)

Awards

1960 Hugo Awards 

 Best Novel: Starship Troopers by Robert A. Heinlein
 Best Short Fiction: "Flowers for Algernon" by Daniel Keyes
 Best Dramatic Presentation: The Twilight Zone
 Best Professional Magazine: The Magazine of Fantasy & Science Fiction edited by Robert P. Mills
 Best Professional Artist: Ed Emshwiller
 Best Fanzine: Cry of the Nameless by F. M. Busby, Elinor Busby, Burnett Toskey, and Wally Weber

Other awards 

 Special Award: Hugo Gernsback as "The Father of Magazine Science Fiction"

See also 

 Hugo Award
 Science fiction
 Speculative fiction
 World Science Fiction Society
 Worldcon

References

External links 

 Hugo.org: 1960 Hugo Awards

1960 conferences
1960 in Pennsylvania
1960 in the United States
Culture of Pittsburgh
Science fiction conventions in the United States
Worldcon